The Chinese Academy of Management Science, is a research institute of management in Beijing, People's Republic of China.

History
On 1 September 1986, the communist paramount leader Chen Yun advised to set up the academy, and put Song Ping was in charge of the task. By 2 June 1987, it was officially confirmed by the central government.

On 5 July 1987, its opening ceremony was held at the Beijing Friendship Hotel, with Li Tieying, Gao Yang, Yu Ruomu (于若木), who joined its Presidential Committee. Sociologist Fei Xiaotong and physicist Chien Wei-zang were its first Honorary Co-presidents, and Tian Fu (田夫) was its first executive President.

References
 Chinese Academy of Management Science 

Science and technology in the People's Republic of China
Research institutes in China